Freebie and the Bean was a short-lived nine-episode American action comedy film television series about two off-beat plainclothes police detectives in San Francisco. Based on the 1974 film of the same name, it starred Tom Mason and Héctor Elizondo in the title roles and was broadcast on CBS on Saturday nights at 9:00 PM in December 1980 and January 1981.

Cast
 Tom Mason as Det. Sgt. Tim "Freebie" Walker
 Héctor Elizondo as Det. Sgt. Dan "Bean" Delgado
 William Daniels as Dist. Atty. Walter W. Cruikshank
 George Loros as Willie
 Jeannetta Arnette
 Kimberly Beck
 Victoria Carroll as Louise
 Jon Cypher as Dwight Rollins
 Shannon Farnon as Dr. Brimmer
 Ben Hammer as Dr. Bronson
 Katherine Justice as Marsha
 Lori Lethin as Alice
 Donald May as Paul Stacey
 Patricia Pivaar as Gwen Brown
 Sharon Spelman as Stella Wickham
 Joseph Wiseman as Dr. Dorf
 Bill Beyers as George Wilson
 John Carter as Vernon Wilson
 Sandra de Bruin as Melodie Parsons
 Charles Dierkop as Wingy Landon
 Frank Farmer as Borchek
 BarBara Luna as Rita Valdez
 Karen Rushmore
 Mykelti Williamson as Lemar Washington
 Mel Stewart as Rodney "Axle" Blake

Reception
The show ran opposite the very popular series The Love Boat, which overshadowed it in viewer polls. In their book The Complete Directory to Prime Time Network and Cable TV Shows, 1946-Present, authors Tim Brooks and Earle F. Marsh write, "Unfortunately this series was such as mishmash of comedy and drama, slapstick and reality, that it soon sank without a trace. The fact that it was scheduled opposite ABC's The Love Boat-which had no trouble defining what it wanted to be-probably didn't help."

Episodes

References

External links
 

1980 American television series debuts
1981 American television series endings
1980s American crime television series
1980s American police comedy television series
CBS original programming
English-language television shows
Fictional portrayals of the San Francisco Police Department
Live action television shows based on films
Television shows set in San Francisco
American crime comedy television series
American action comedy television series